SM UB-62 was a German Type UB III submarine or U-boat in the German Imperial Navy during World War I. She was commissioned into the German Imperial Navy on 9 July 1917 as SM UB-62.

UB-62 was surrendered 21 November 1918 in accordance with the requirements of the Armistice with Germany and broken up in Swansea in 1921.

Construction

UB-62 was ordered by the GIN on 20 May 1916.

She was built by AG Vulcan of Hamburg and following just under a year of construction, launched at Hamburg on 11 May 1917. UB-62 was commissioned later that same year . Like all Type UB III submarines, UB-62 carried 10 torpedoes and was armed with a  deck gun. UB-62 had a displacement of  while surfaced and  when submerged. Her engines enabled her to travel at  when surfaced and  when submerged.

Summary of raiding history

References

Notes

Citations

Bibliography 

 

German Type UB III submarines
World War I submarines of Germany
U-boats commissioned in 1917
1917 ships
Ships built in Hamburg